Fred E. White (born Frederick Eugene Adams; January 13, 1955 – January 1, 2023) was an American musician and songwriter. He was one of the early members of Earth, Wind & Fire. He previously played drums on Donny Hathaway's Live album.

Earth, Wind & Fire consisting of Fred White along with half-brother Maurice White, brother Verdine White, and other members were inducted into the Rock & Roll Hall of Fame in 2000.

White died on January 1, 2023, aged 67.

Discography
 1969: "La La Time" – The Salty Peppers (tambourine) 
 1969: "Mama's Baby Ain't A Baby No More" – Marilyn (Kitty) Hayward (drums)
 1970: "Do It Like Mama" – Simtec & Wylie (drums)
 1970: "Pass It On" – Pieces of Peace (drums) 
 1971: "Mama Said Thank You" – Albertina Walker & The Caravans (drums)
 1972: Live – Donny Hathaway (drums) 
 1973: Fully Exposed – Willie Hutch (drums)
 1973: Extension of a Man – Donny Hathaway (drums)
 1974: Howdy Moon – Howdy Moon (drums) 
 1974: Caston & Majors – Caston & Majors (drums)
 1974: Feats Don't Fail Me Now – Little Feat (drums, songwriter) 
 1974: Heart Like a Wheel – Linda Ronstadt - drums
 1975: That's the Way of the World – Earth, Wind & Fire (drums)
 1975: Gratitude – Earth, Wind & Fire (drums)
 1976: Spirit – Earth, Wind & Fire (drums)
 1976: This Is Niecy – Deniece Williams (drums)
 1976: Flowers – The Emotions (drums)
 1977: Song Bird – Deniece Williams (drums)
 1977: Rejoice – The Emotions (drums)
 1977: All 'n All – Earth, Wind & Fire (drums, percussion, songwriter)
 1978: Sunbeam – The Emotions (drums)
 1979: I Am – Earth, Wind & Fire (drums)
 1980: Faces – Earth, Wind & Fire (drums)
 1981: Raise! – Earth, Wind & Fire (drums)
 1981: Blues for the Night Owl – Ramsey Lewis (percussion) 
 1983: Powerlight – Earth, Wind & Fire (drums)
 1983: Feel My Soul – Jennifer Holliday (drums)
 1983: Electric Universe – Earth, Wind & Fire (drums)

References

External links

1955 births
2023 deaths
20th-century African-American musicians
20th-century American drummers
American male drummers
American soul musicians
American funk drummers
Musicians from Chicago
Earth, Wind & Fire members
Soul drummers